Flames of Convention was the third novel by F. J. Thwaites.

Plot
An artist, Brett Hardy, and his beloved, a squatter's daughter, defy convention to live their lives their own way and suffer for it. The novel is set in Sydney and rural New South Wales.

Plagiarism accusations
Eighteen months after publication, it was alleged that a section of Chapter Fifteen the book closely resembled the opening chapter of Susan Lennox: Her Fall and Rise (1912) by David Phillips.

Adaptation
In 1935 it was announced the book would be filmed in England but this did not happen.

References

External links
Flames of Convention at AustLit

1933 Australian novels
Novels set in New South Wales